The 2010–11 season was Livingston's first season back in the Second Division, having been promoted after winning the Third Division during season 2009–10. They also competed in the Challenge Cup, League Cup and the Scottish Cup.

Overview
The 2010–11 season was Livingston's first season back in the Scottish Second Division having been promoted as champions from the Third Division. Despite poor form in the cups being knocked out in all their opening rounds, they won the Second Division with 5 games to spare with a 3–0 win over Stenhousemuir. After all games were completed they were 23 points ahead over nearest rival Ayr United.

Results and fixtures

Scottish Second Division

Scottish Challenge Cup

Scottish League Cup

Scottish Cup

Statistics

Squad 

 
 

                                                                    

           

 
 
|}

Disciplinary record

League table

References

Livingston
Livingston F.C. seasons